Corsairs of the Turku Waste is a 1982 role-playing game adventure published by Judges Guild for Traveller.

Plot summary
Corsairs of the Turku Waste is an adventure that takes place in the Gateway Quadrant, with an area in the Crucis Margin mapped as the primary location, though other Gateway locations are suggested as well.

Publication history
Corsairs of the Turku Waste was written by Dave Sering and was published in 1981 by Judges Guild as a 32-page book.

Reception
William A. Barton reviewed Corsairs of the Turku Waste in The Space Gamer No. 52. Barton commented that "Corsairs of the Turku Waste stands, along with Simba Safari, as one of Judges Guild's best Traveller adventures since Tancred."

References

Judges Guild publications
Role-playing game supplements introduced in 1982
Traveller (role-playing game) adventures